Arzest Corporation (Japanese: アーゼスト, Hepburn: Āzesuto) is a Japanese video game development company that develops games for video game consoles. It was formed on June 25, 2010 by key members of Artoon, which was also founded by Executive Vice President Naoto Ohshima, best known as the character designer of Sonic the Hedgehog, as well as his nemesis Dr. Eggman. Arzest was also founded by key Artoon and Sega members who worked on the Panzer Dragoon series.

Company profile 
They were recruited by Nintendo to work on mini-games in Wii Play: Motion for the Wii. According to their portion of the credits of the game, as many as a dozen of former Artoon and Sega employees now work at Arzest.

They worked on additional new features of one of the main Nintendo 3DS built-in software applications StreetPass Mii Plaza, such as adding SpotPass features to Puzzle Swap among others.

Arzest has since released several retail games on the 3DS: Yoshi's New Island in 2014, Mario & Sonic at the Rio 2016 Olympic Games in 2016, and Hey! Pikmin in 2017.

Games

References

External links 

Privately held companies of Japan
Video game companies of Japan
Video game development companies
Video game companies established in 2010
Japanese companies established in 2010
Companies based in Yokohama